Marcus Vinicius may refer to:

Marcus Vinicius (consul 19 BC), Roman consul and general
Marcus Vinicius (consul 30), Roman consul
Marcus Vinícius Cesário (born 1986), Brazilian footballer
Marcus Vinicius de Souza (born 1984), Brazilian basketball player
Marcus Vinicius de Morais (born 1974), Brazilian footballer
Marcus Vinícius da Cruz Alves Nóbrega (born 1983), Brazilian footballer
Marcus Vinícius Dias (1923–1992), Brazilian basketball player
Marcus Vinícius Simões Freire (born 1962), Brazilian former volleyball player
Marcus Vinicius Urban Toledo dos Reis (born 1986), Brazilian/Spanish basketball player
Marcus Vinícius Lima da Silva (born 1990), Brazilian footballer
Vinicius de Moraes (Marcus Vinicius da Cruz de Mello Moraes, 1913–1980), Brazilian musician
Marcus Vinicius da Silva de Oliveira, Brazilian footballer
Marcus Vinícius Vidal Cunha (born 1992), Brazilian footballer
Marcus Vinicius Molinari Reis (1997–2021), Brazilian footballer

See also
 Marcos Vinícius (disambiguation)